Steadfast Networks is a Chicago, Illinois-based Internet Service Provider primarily focused on Cloud Computing, Dedicated Servers and Colocation. It is a division of Nozone, Inc., a company founded in 1998 by then high-school student Karl Zimmerman in Fond du Lac, Wisconsin and incorporated in 2000. In 2008 it was named number 370 on the Inc 500 5000 Fastest Growing Private Companies in America List and was on the Inc 5000 List of the Largest Companies in America in both 2009 and 2010.

Locations
Steadfast currently has datacenter facilities in 3 locations: Two in downtown Chicago and one in Edison, New Jersey.

Steadfast has a private network with peering points throughout the United States along with London and Amsterdam.

Controversy
In November 2007 the Chicago Tribune published an article on the hosting of hate sites in America, where they are protected by the First Amendment. The Anti-Defamation League noted that Steadfast hosted 17 such sites. Steadfast responded on the official company blog to clarify that they are strong supporters of the First Amendment, but against hate speech.

References

External links

Official website
Steadfast Blog
Steadfast Support

Web hosting